Sheranapis is a genus of South American araneomorph spiders in the family Anapidae, first described by Norman I. Platnick & Raymond Robert Forster in 1989.  it contains only three species, all found in Chile.

References

Anapidae
Araneomorphae genera
Spiders of South America
Taxa named by Raymond Robert Forster
Endemic fauna of Chile